Harold Brook (15 October 1921 in Sheffield, England – 1998) was a footballer who played as an inside forward for Sheffield United and Leeds United in the 1940s and 1950s.

References

1921 births
1998 deaths
Association football forwards
Hallam F.C. players
Sheffield United F.C. players
Leeds United F.C. players
Lincoln City F.C. players
English Football League players
Footballers from Sheffield
English footballers
20th-century English people